Shun Sato may refer to:

, Japanese figure skater
, Japanese footballer